Bilqis Prasista (born 24 May 2003) is an Indonesian badminton player affiliated with Djarum Badminton Club. She was invited to be part of Indonesia's national badminton team in 2020. She was part of the Indonesian women's winning team at the 2022 Asia Team Championships.

Personal Life
Prasista is the daughter of Joko Supriyanto, a gold medalist at the 1993 World Championships in the men's singles, and Zelin Resiana, a former women's doubles bronze medalist at the 1997 World Championships. Both Supriyanto and Resiana won the gold medal at the 1995 Badminton World Cup.

Her twin sister, Bilqis Pratista, is also a badminton player affiliated with Djarum Badminton Club.

Career
In 2022, she beat the then reigning world champion and world number 1, Akane Yamaguchi, at the group stage of the 2022 Uber Cup.

Achievements

BWF Junior International (1 title, 1 runner-up) 

Girls' doubles

  BWF Junior International Grand Prix tournament
  BWF Junior International Challenge tournament
  BWF Junior International Series tournament
  BWF Junior Future Series tournament

References 

2003 births
Living people
People from Magelang
Sportspeople from Central Java
Indonesian female badminton players